General elections were held in Tonga on 23 and 24 April 2008 to elect members of the Legislative Assembly. The nobles were elected on 23 April, and the nine people's representatives on 24 April. A total of 32,000 people turned out to vote, giving a turnout of 48%.

71 candidates had filed for the people's representatives' seats, among them eight women. All nine incumbents stood for reelection, with six retaining their seats. Most of the pro-democracy MPs were returned, despite several facing charges of sedition over the 2006 Nuku'alofa riots. Reportedly, all nine elected MPs were pro-democracy activists.

These elections were the last ones before democratic reforms expected to be implemented in 2010, which would change the seat balance as follows: 17 MPs would be popularly elected, nine MPs would be elected by the nobles and four MPs appointed by the king.

Viliami Uasike Latu requested a recount in Vava'u, the constituency he contested, as he missed out on the second seat there by only 51 votes. The recount was conducted from 5 to 9 May at the Office of the Governor of Vava’u, and confirmed the original result.

Controversy

About two weeks before the election, it was announced that the Tonga Broadcasting Commission would henceforth censor candidates' political broadcasts, and that TBC reporters would be banned from reporting on political matters, allegedly because they lacked the necessary training for objective coverage. The decision was criticised by the Pacific Islands News Association, and New Zealand's Minister of Revenue, Peter Dunne, commented that it was "unfortunate". Tonga Review said that the decision was a restriction on freedom of speech, and compared Tonga with Zimbabwe, a comparison rejected by the TBC. Tongan MP Clive Edwards said that the TBC's decision was aimed at stifling criticism of the government in the lead-up to the election, and to hamper the re-election chances of pro-democracy MPs. Pesi Fonua, head of the Tonga Media Council, said that the election "very much depends on how the candidates present themselves", and that censorship would "definitely have an impact".

Results

By constituency

People's Representatives

Nobles' representatives
Nine nobles were elected by the 29 eligible members of the nobility on 23 April. All 29 voters cast votes. There were no nominations, and no candidates. Tu'iha'angana, outgoing Speaker of the House, lost his seat in Ha'apai.

References

External links
 "Tongans confused and undecided on eve of 2008 General Election", Mary Lyn Fonue, Matangi Tonga, 23 April 2008
 "Results, 2008 Tonga Parliamentary General Election" Matangi Tonga, 25 April 2008
 "Noble Fielakepa and Noble Ma'afu elected into Parliament", Tonga Review, 23 April 2008

Tonga
General election
Elections in Tonga
April 2008 events in Oceania